Saint Gwenafwy (Wenappa) (fl. 6th c.) was a pre-congregational saint of medieval South Wales.
She was a daughter of  Caw of Strathclyde, and sister of Peillan, Eigron and Peithein among others. She went to Cornwall with her brother Eigron where she is the patroness of Gwennap.

Her feast day is 1 July.

References

Year of birth unknown
6th-century Christian saints
Welsh Roman Catholic saints
Female saints of medieval Wales
6th-century women
6th-century Welsh people
6th-century Welsh women